John Aymer Dalrymple, 13th Earl of Stair  (9 October 1906 – 26 February 1996), was a British peer. Styled Viscount Dalrymple from 1906 until 1961

Dalrymple was the son of John Dalrymple, 12th Earl of Stair and Violet Evelyn Harford. He served as Lord-Lieutenant of Wigtownshire from 1961 to 1983. He also competed in the four-man bobsleigh event at the 1928 Winter Olympics.

Family
Lord Stair married the Queen's cousin, Davina Katherine Bowes-Lyon (2 May 1930 – 1 November 2017), daughter of Sir David Bowes-Lyon and Rachel Pauline Clay, on 14 January 1960. They had three children and ten grandchildren:

John David James Dalrymple, 14th Earl of Stair (b. 4 September 1961) he married Hon. Emily Mary Julia Stonor on 17 June 2006. They have three children.
Hon. David Hew Dalrymple (b. 30 March 1963) he married Emma R. Woods and they have three children
Alexander John Peter Dalrymple (b. 29 April 2007)
Davina Alice Louisa Dalrymple (b. 19 April 2009)
Harry David Fergus Dalrymple (b. 6 April 2015)
Hon. Michael Colin Dalrymple (b. 1 April 1965) he married Harriet Lucy Buxton in 1991. They have four children:
William Hew Dalrymple (b. 1992) 
Angus Dalrymple (b. 1993) 
Peter Dalrymple (b. 26 April 1996) 
Flora Dalrymple (b. 2001)

Death
Lord Stair died on 26 February 1996, aged 89, and was succeeded by his eldest son, John.

References

Sources
Burke's Peerage, Baronetage & Knightage, 107th edition, 3 volumes (Wilmington, Delaware, U.S.A.: Burke's Peerage (Genealogical Books) Ltd., 2003).

External links

1906 births
1996 deaths
Earls of Stair
Knights Commander of the Royal Victorian Order
Lord-Lieutenants of Wigtown
Members of the Order of the British Empire
Members of the Royal Company of Archers
British male bobsledders
Olympic bobsledders of Great Britain
Bobsledders at the 1928 Winter Olympics